Esmeralda is a municipality and town in the Camagüey Province of Cuba.

Geography
The municipality is divided into the barrios of Brasil (also known as Jaronú), Caonao, Guanaja, Quemado and Tabor.

Cayo Romano, one of the cays of Jardines del Rey archipelago is located north of Esmeralda, across the Bay of la Jiguey (Bahia de Jiguey).

Demographics
In 2004, the municipality of Esmeralda had a population of 29,953.

Economy
The economy is based on crops of  sugarcane, coconuts, pineapple, oranges and tobacco.

See also
Esmeralda Municipal Museum
List of cities in Cuba
Municipalities of Cuba

References

External links

Populated places in Camagüey Province